1683 Castafiore, provisional designation , is a carbonaceous background asteroid from the central region of the asteroid belt, approximately 21 kilometers in diameter. It was discovered on 19 September 1950, by Belgian astronomer Sylvain Arend at Royal Observatory of Belgium in Uccle, Belgium, and named after the character Bianca Castafiore from The Adventures of Tintin.

Orbit and classification 

The C-type asteroid orbits the Sun in the middle main-belt at a distance of 2.3–3.2 AU once every 4 years and 6 months (1,653 days). Its orbit has an eccentricity of 0.18 and an inclination of 12° with respect to the ecliptic.

Naming 

This minor planet was named for Bianca Castafiore, a fictional character in the comic-strip Adventures of Tintin . On the occasion of his seventy-fifth birthday, the father of the fictional character, Georges Remi, better known under his pseudonym Hergé, was honoured by the minor planet 1652 Hergé. The approved naming citation was published by the Minor Planet Center on 8 April 1982.

Physical characteristics

Rotation period 

In September 2004, American astronomer Donald P. Pray obtained a rotational lightcurve of Castafiore from photometric observations. It gave a rotation period of 13.931 hours with a brightness variation of 0.66 magnitude.

Diameter and albedo 

According to the survey carried out by NASA's Wide-field Infrared Survey Explorer with its subsequent NEOWISE mission, Castafiore measures 21.15 kilometers in diameter and its surface has an albedo of 0.160 (best result only), while the Collaborative Asteroid Lightcurve Link assumes a standard albedo for carbonaceous asteroids of 0.057, and calculates a diameter of 25.44 kilometers with an absolute magnitude of 11.7.

Notes

References

External links 
 Asteroid Lightcurve Database (LCDB), query form (info )
 Dictionary of Minor Planet Names, Google books
 Asteroids and comets rotation curves, CdR – Observatoire de Genève, Raoul Behrend
 Discovery Circumstances: Numbered Minor Planets (1)-(5000)  – Minor Planet Center
 
 

001683
Discoveries by Sylvain Arend
Named minor planets
Tintin
19500919